Jasper William Davies (born 3 October 1992) is an English former first-class cricketer.

Davies was born at Northampton where he was educated at Northampton School for Boys, before going up to Oxford Brookes University. While at Oxford Brookes he made a single appearance in first-class cricket for Oxford MCCU against Warwickshire at Oxford in 2014. Playing as a wicket-keeper, Davies batted once during the match, scoring 5 runs in the Oxford MCCU first-innings, before being dismissed by Jonathan Trott. He played minor counties cricket for Oxfordshire in that same season, making an appearance each in the Minor Counties Championship and MCCA Knockout Trophy.

Notes and references

External links

1992 births
Living people
Cricketers from Northampton
People educated at Northampton School for Boys
Alumni of Oxford Brookes University
English cricketers
Oxford MCCU cricketers
Oxfordshire cricketers